The cherry blotch miner moth (Phyllonorycter propinquinella) is a moth of the family Gracillariidae. It is known from Canada (Québec and Nova Scotia) and the United States (Illinois, Ohio, Maine, Maryland, New York, Michigan, Vermont and Connecticut).

The wingspan is 8–9 mm.

The larvae feed on Prunus serotina. They mine the leaves of their host plant. The mine has the form of a tentiform mine on the underside of the leaf.

References

External links
Phyllonorycter at microleps.org

propinquinella
Moths of North America
Moths described in 1908